Julie Cohen may refer to:

 Julie E. Cohen, American legal scholar in intellectual property and Internet law
 Julie Cohen, actor and entertainer
 Julie Cohen (writer)

See also
Julie Coin, French tennis player
Julia Cohen, American tennis player